Bayle can refer to:

A position in medieval France and Spain similar to that of a bailiff
François Bayle, a French composer of acousmatic music
George A. Bayle Jr., first to market peanut butter
Jean-Michel Bayle, a French motorcycle racer
Pierre Bayle, a philosopher
Bayle Mountain in New Hampshire, United States
Bayle Museum in Bridlington, East Yorkshire

See also
Bale (disambiguation)
Beyle (disambiguation)

Occitan-language surnames